Our Lady of Meritxell is an Andorran Roman Catholic statue depicting an apparition of the Virgin Mary. Our Lady of Meritxell is the patron saint of Andorra. The original statue dated from the late 12th century. However, the chapel in which it was housed burned down on 8 September 1972, and the statue was destroyed. A replica can be found in the new Meritxell Basilica, designed in 1976 by Ricardo Bofill Taller de Arquitectura.    

Merig is a name used by shepherds to denote a pasture with lot of sun.

The image was canonically crowned by Pope Benedict XV on 8 September 1921.

Legend

In the late 12th century, on January 6, a wild rose in bloom was found by villagers from Meritxell going to Mass in Canillo. It was out of season and at its base was found a statue of the Virgin and Child.  
The statue was placed in the Canillo church. However, the statue was found under the same wild rose the next day. The statue was taken to the church of Encamp. However, as before, the statue was again found under the same wild rose on the next day. As in similar legends elsewhere, the villagers of Meritxell took this as a sign and decided to build a new chapel in their town after they found an open space miraculously untouched by the winter snows.

Influence

The feast day of Our Lady of Meritxell is September 8 and the Andorran National Day.

The image is also mentioned in the anthem of Andorra.

"Meritxell" is a relatively frequent female name among Andorran women and other Catalan-speaking women.

Notable persons with the name include:

 Meritxell Lavanchy, actress.
 Meritxell Mateu i Pi, former foreign minister of Andorra.
 Meritxell Batet Lamaña, member of the Council of Europe.

The hospital, Nostra Senyora de Meritxell Hospital is also named after her.

See also
 Other Catalan female names Núria and Urgell.
 List of works by Ricardo Bofill Taller de Arquitectura

References

External links
Our Lady of Meritxell official website

12th-century sculptures
12th-century establishments in Andorra
Meritxell
Meritxell
Catholic Church in Andorra
Ricardo Bofill buildings
Buildings and structures in Andorra
Tourist attractions in Andorra
Public holidays in Andorra
September events
Romanesque sculptures